The Delhi–Kalka line is a railway line connecting Delhi and . It connects to the UNESCO World Heritage Site  Kalka–Shimla Railway.

History
The Delhi–Panipat–Ambala–Kalka line was opened in 1891.

The -wide narrow-gauge Kalka–Shimla Railway was constructed by Delhi–Panipat–Ambala–Kalka Railway Company and opened for traffic in 1903. In 1905 the line was regauged to -wide narrow gauge.

Electrification
Sabjimandi (Delhi)–Panipat–Karnal sector was electrified in 1992–1995, Karnal–Kurukshetra sector in 1995–96, Kurukshetra–Ambala in 1996–98, Ambala–Chandigarh in 1998–99 and Chandigarh–Kalka in 1999–2000.

Loco sheds
Ambala has a diesel  loco shed for minor maintenance of WDS-4 shunters. The locos are sent to Shakurbasti for major maintenance or repairs.  Kalka has a narrow-gauge diesel shed for the maintenance of ZDM-3 and ZDM-5 narrow-gauge diesel locos.

Speed limits
The Delhi–Panipat–Ambala–Kalka line is classified as a ‘Group B’ line which can take speeds up to 130 km/h.

Passenger movement

Railway reorganisation
In 1952, Eastern Railway,  Northern Railway and North Eastern Railway were formed. Eastern Railway was formed with a portion of East Indian Railway Company, east of Mughalsarai and Bengal Nagpur Railway. Northern Railway was formed with a portion of East Indian Railway Company west of Mughalsarai, Jodhpur Railway, Bikaner Railway and Eastern Punjab Railway.

References

External links
  Trains at Panipat
 Trains at Kurukshetra
 Trains at Ambala Cantonment 
 Trains at Chandigarh
 Trains at Kalka

5 ft 6 in gauge railways in India
Rail transport in Haryana
Railway lines opened in 1891
Transport in Kalka
Transport in Delhi